Nemanja Ahčin (born 7 April 1994) is a Serbian football midfielder, playing with Dinamo Pančevo.

References

External links
 
 Nemanja Ahčin stats at utakmica.rs
 
 

1994 births
Living people
Sportspeople from Pančevo
Association football midfielders
Serbian footballers
Red Star Belgrade footballers
FK Radnik Surdulica players
OFK Grbalj players
Montenegrin First League players
FK Mladost Lučani players
FK Novi Pazar players
FK Dinamo Pančevo players
FK Mačva Šabac players
Serbian First League players
Serbian SuperLiga players